TKOL may refer to:

The King of Limbs, a 2011 album by  Radiohead
The King of Limbs: Live from the Basement, a 2011 live video album of songs from The King of Limbs
TKOL RMX 1234567, a 2011 remix album of songs from The King of Limbs